Mycopathologia is a peer-reviewed scientific journal that covers the role of fungi in human and animal disease, i.e., medical and veterinary mycology. The journal was established in 1938 and is currently published by Springer Link. The current editor-in-chief is Vishnu Chaturvedi (California Department of Public Health / University of California, Berkeley).

History
The journal was initially established by Wilhelm Junk in The Hague as Mycopathologia in 1938. Then in 1950, it continued publication under the name Mycopathologia & Mycologia Applicata, before returning to Mycopathologia in 1975. From 1959 to 1984, a supplement Iconographia Mycologica was published alongside it.

Abstracting and indexing
Mycopathologia is abstracted and indexed in the following databases:

References

Further reading

External links
  @ Springer
 Iconographia Mycologica @ Springer

Mycology journals
Publications established in 1938
Springer Science+Business Media academic journals
English-language journals
Irregular journals